Mykola Vladislavovich Zlochevsky (born 14 June 1966) is a Ukrainian oil and natural gas businessman, politician, and an oligarch. Zlochevsky was Minister of Ecology and Natural Resources from July 2010 until April 2012 and was the deputy secretary for Economic and Social Security on the National Security and Defense Council from April 2012 until February 2014 when Euromaidan occurred.

Biography

Business
In 2002, he co-founded the largest independent oil and natural gas company Burisma Holdings with Ukrainian businessman . Through his sole ownership of Cyprus-registered Burisma Holdings, he owns the Ukrainian gas and oil producers Aldea, Pari, Esko-Pivnich, and the First Ukrainian Petroleum Company and the investment group Brociti Investments.

Governmental posts
Zlochevsky served as Ecology and Natural Resources Minister during most of the first cabinet of Mykola Azarov, and during both the later part of Azarov's first government and all of Azarov's second government, he served as deputy secretary on National Security and Defense Council (NSDC) of the President of Ukraine Viktor Yanukovych.

Investigations into Burisma and Zlochevsky
In 2012, Viktor Pshonka, the Ukrainian prosecutor general, began investigating Burisma Holdings owner, Zlochevsky, over allegations of money laundering, tax evasion, and corruption during 2010–2012.

In April 2014 Zlochevsky named Hunter Biden, son of then U. S. Vice President Joe Biden, to Burisma’s board as a director of Burisma, where he was said to have earned over $80,000 monthly. Joe Biden had been made the point man on Ukraine after February 2014, when the pro-Russian president, Viktor Yanukovych, was ousted and fled. Then U. S. President Barack Obama's administration was prepared to work with the new government, a position shared with European governments and institutions, such as the World Bank and the International Monetary Fund. But they were all concerned about Ukraine's corruption, which had plagued the country ever since it gained independence in the 1991 breakup of the Soviet Union. Joe Biden became a frequent visitor to Ukraine. By his own count, Biden said he went there about a dozen times from early 2014 through early 2016.

In April 2014, the Serious Fraud Office of the United Kingdom froze approximately $23 million belonging to companies controlled by Zlochevsky. At the end of 2014, Zlochevsky fled Ukraine amid allegations of unlawful self enrichment and legalization of funds (Article 368–2, Criminal Code of Ukraine) during his tenure in public office. In January 2015, Prosecutor General Vitaly Yarema announced that Zlochevsky had been put on the wanted list for alleged financial corruption. At the end of January 2015, the Central Criminal Court in London released the $23 million that were blocked on accounts of Zlochevsky due to inadequate evidence. In June 2018, the Serious Fraud Office stated that the case was closed.

In early November 2014 Deutsche Bank reported that $24 million of funds from his companies were wired from Cyprus to the Latvia branch of PrivatBank, the bank co-owned by the oligarch in the Dnipropetrovsk region, Ihor Kolomoyskyi, and nationalized at the end of 2016.

Zlochevsky returned to Ukraine in February 2018 after investigations into his Burisma Holdings had been completed in December 2017 with no charges filed against him.

On 18 April 2018, an alleged recording of part of a conversation between President of Ukraine Petro Poroshenko and fugitive Ukrainian lawmaker Oleksandr Onyshchenko was released by Onyshchenko which implicated Zlochevsky in graft. 

On 15 June 2018, after the Solomyansky District Court in Kyiv had annulled the ruling of the Specialized Anti-Corruption Prosecutor's Office (SAP) to close a criminal proceeding against him in 2017, Zlochevsky was accused of having illegally issued, while he was Ecology Minister in 2010–2012, oil and gas licenses to the companies that belonged to him.

According to Ukrainian authorities Zlochevsky is suspected of "theft of government funds on an especially large scale". Authorities said the criminal investigation on suspicion of embezzlement is currently on hold because Zlochevsky's whereabouts cannot presently be determined. As of 2019, Zlochevsky is reported to live in Monaco. According to an investigation by Al Jazeera he bought Cypriot citizenship somewhere between 2017 and 2019.

Notes

References

External links
 ЗЛОЧЕВСЬКИЙ Микола Владиславович (Mykola Vladislavovich Zlochevsky) biography in Ukrainian from PEP.ua.org

1966 births
Living people
Politicians from Kyiv
Odesa Law Academy alumni
Businesspeople from Kyiv
Fourth convocation members of the Verkhovna Rada
Fifth convocation members of the Verkhovna Rada
Sixth convocation members of the Verkhovna Rada
Ecology and natural resources ministers of Ukraine
Social Democratic Party of Ukraine (united) politicians
Party of Regions politicians
21st-century Ukrainian businesspeople
21st-century Ukrainian politicians